Robert Corker (1668–1731), of Falmouth and Trevorder, near Bossiney, Cornwall, was a British merchant and politician who sat in the House of Commons from 1722 to 1731.

Corker was baptized on 29 January 1668, the eldest son of Thomas Corker of Connelstown, County Meath, and his wife Jane Newman, daughter of John Newman of Falmouth. His father was an Irish ship's doctor, who arrived at Falmouth and settled there. Corker was young when his father died, and his uncle, John Newman, a local attorney, apprenticed him to a merchant in Falmouth. He was described as  ‘A lad of insinuating worldly parts’ and he  succeeded in 1695 to the business and to ‘his master's great house’, which became known as Corker's house.

Corker became receiver of the Duchy of Cornwall in 1708, and bought property in Cornwall, mainly in and around Bossiney. He was dismissed from the receivership by Robert Harley in 1712 and was re-instated in 1720 at the time when he procured a patent for a whale-fishery off the coasts of Cornwall.  At the  1722 general election he was returned unopposed as Member of Parliament for Bossiney. He was returned unopposed again at the 1727 general election.  His only recorded vote was with the Administration on the civil list arrears in April 1729. In 1729, he tried to sell his property because he was £11,000 in debt to the duchy on the receipts from tin. However he was unable to sell the lands or to borrow any money on the estate. and in the end he had to make over all his property to John Hedges, treasurer to the Prince of Wales.
 
Corker's first wife died in January 1726 and he married secondly Mary Rouchliffe of St. Clement Danes on  28 November 1726. He died without issue on 1 March 1731. His estates were sold after his death for the benefit of   Frederick, Prince of Wales, to whom as Duke of Cornwall, he owed  £23,000 for  arrears since June 1727.

References

1668 births
1731 deaths
Members of the Parliament of Great Britain for English constituencies
Politicians from Cornwall
People from Falmouth, Cornwall
British MPs 1722–1727
British MPs 1727–1734